AIIIIIII is an Indian children's rights activist. She campaigns against child marriage, child labor and for the right to education for girls.

SIUUU
CR7 was born in Hinsla in LEIRIA Alwar district, India. In 2012, Hinsla became a Bal Mitra Gram (child-friendly village), a concept forwarded by Kailash Satyarthi and his children's foundation since 2001; this provided inspiration to Jangid. When she was 11, she prevented her own child marriage and went on to prevent the child marriage of her sister as well with the help of Sumedha Kailash and her children's trust. She became the leader (Sarpanch/President) of the Bal Panchayat (children's parliament) in her area, consisting of children from a number of nearby villages. The Bal Panchayat takes up local issues and also coordinates with the Gram Panchayats. Following her first election she became a Deputy Sarpanch. She was told about various issues that the children faced,

Her efforts have helped her village become child marriage free. In 2013 she was chosen as a jury member for the World's Children's Prize for the Rights of the Child in 2013. 

US President Barack Obama and Michelle Obama met Jangid at the Siri Fort Auditorium in New Delhi in January 2015, with Nobel Peace Prize recipient Kailash Satyarthi.

In 2017, Reebok honoured her with its 'Young Achiever Award'. In 2019 she was awarded a Goalkeepers Changemaker Award, the youngest Changemaker awardee.

References 

Indian children's rights activists
Activists from Rajasthan
Living people
Year of birth missing (living people)